Charles William Wikle (born December 15, 1978) is an American actor and reality television personality best known for his appearance in the fifth American season of Big Brother. He was an openly gay contestant on the reality series.

Wikle parlayed his Big Brother notoriety into a gig as co-host of the Logo network travel-themed program, Round Trip Ticket. Wikle was a contestant on Bravo's sports/reality series Battle of the Network Reality Stars. In 2008, Wikle was cast as Jasper in the gay spoof sequel, Another Gay Sequel: Gays Gone Wild!, released December 9, 2008.

In 2016, Wikle starred in the gay adult film The Stillest Hour for CockyBoys.

Credits

References

External links
 
 

1978 births
Living people
People from Bangor, Maine
American actors in gay pornographic films
American nurses
Big Brother (American TV series) contestants
American gay actors
Male nurses